Kamlesh or Kamalesh is a given name which may refer to:

Kamlesh Khunti, British physician
Kamlesh Kumari (died 2001), police constable who thwarted a terrorist attack on the Parliament of India; posthumous recipient of the Ashoka Chakra Award, India's highest peacetime award
Kamlesh Oza, Indian television actor
Kamlesh Patel, Baron Patel of Bradford (born 1960), British politician and life peer
Kamlesh Pattni, Kenyan businessman 
Kamlesh Reddy, Fijian politician
Kamalesh Sharma (born 1941), Secretary General of the Commonwealth of Nations
Kamalesh Sirkar, professor of chemical engineering and inventor